The Federal Railroad Administration (FRA) is an agency in the United States Department of Transportation (DOT). The agency was created by the Department of Transportation Act of 1966. The purpose of the FRA is to promulgate and enforce rail safety regulations, administer railroad assistance programs, conduct research and development in support of improved railroad safety and national rail transportation policy, provide for the rehabilitation of Northeast Corridor rail passenger service, and consolidate government support of rail transportation activities.

The FRA is one of ten agencies within DOT concerned with intermodal transportation. It operates through seven divisions under the offices of the Administrator and Deputy Administrator. These divisions are: Financial Management and Administration, Chief Counsel, Civil Rights, Public Affairs, Public Engagement, Railroad Policy and Development, and Safety. It has a staff of about 850.

Function 

All passenger and freight rail travel in the United States on the national interconnected rail infrastructure is subject to regulation by the FRA. FRA regulates public and intercity rail services, but does not regulate "closed" railways that operate exclusively on private property, such as a rail system between buildings at a steel mill, nor does it regulate subways, light rail or elevated intra-city passenger rail systems that do not connect to any public rail networks. Most notably, the FRA enforces safety regulations, such as speed limits and requirements for safety features such as positive train control. Non-legislative recommendations for FRA policy come from the Rail Safety Advisory Committee, established in 1996, though much of FRA policy is created via congressional legislation; for example, the Rail Safety Improvement Act of 2008 was an act of Congress, which the FRA enforced through a series of regulations published two years later. These regulations include enforcement of positive train control and enforcement of more stringent conductor certification requirements.

Recent safety initiatives
In 2011, the FRA began the process of updating its electronic device policy for active train operators.

In June 2015, the FRA announced a railway safety initiative with Google that would include the FRAs GIS data into its mapping services. The data pinpoints the location of over 250,000 rail crossings in the United States. The FRA believes that providing the location of rail crossings in maps will enhance crossing safety by people who are using navigation systems while driving. The agency also created a web portal for the public to report blocked crossings in order to collect data on the implication for safety and economy of stopped trains blocking crossings.

Citing safety concerns, in 2016 the FRA proposed a rule to mandate train crew sizes but the agency withdrew the rule in 2019 stating "that no regulation of train crew staffing is necessary or appropriate for railroad operations to be conducted safely at this time." This was in part due to the improving safety record for rail and also the implementation of PTC across nearly 60,000 route miles of track.

List of administrators

Northeast Corridor Future 
The FRA's Northeast Corridor (NEC) Future is a long-term plan aimed at improving the nation's Northeast Corridor. The NEC Future plan consists of four components, also known as the Selective Alternative, which are: Improve rail service, Modernize NEC infrastructure, Expand rail capacity, and Study New Haven to Providence capacity. These four components all aim to improve the reliability and performance of the NEC system, whether it be through intercity or regional means. The Selective Alternative looks to do four major things: Improve rail service by increasing frequency of trains, decreasing travel time, and making better passenger convenience; Modernize NEC infrastructure by having corridor-wide repair and replacing and fixing parts to bring the entire system to increased reliability; Expand rail capacity by adding new infrastructure between cities and increasing train speeds and capacity; and Study New Haven to Providence capacity.

The NEC Future ROD (Record of Decision) was issued in July 2017, which marked the completion of the Tier 1 environmental review process. The ROD lays out everything involved with the project, including the plan itself and feedback from individuals, organizations, and stakeholders. There is no listed completion date for the NEC Future and Selective Alternative.

National Rail Plan

Background 
The need for an NRP was brought up in the Passenger Rail Investment and Improvement Act of 2008. However, before the official plan could be drafted, the Passenger Rail Investment and Improvement Act (PRIIA) required a Preliminary National Rail Plan (PNRP) to be made first, which was submitted to congress on October 15, 2009. On December 16, 2009 the Consolidated Appropriations Act of 2010 was enacted into law and established the delivery date for the NRP. The delivery date for the NRP was September 15, 2010.

The goal 
With the nation's infrastructure growing, the transportation used in the nation also needs to grow. With that in mind, the NRP's main goal is to increase the size of the nation's railway capacity to include 70 million more people and 2.8 billion tons more of freight within the next 25 years, and 100 million more people and 4 billion tons more of freight within the next 40 years. The NRP also looks to continue improving the rail systems safety.

High-speed intercity travel 
Another one of the NRP's big goals is the introduction of a high-speed train made for intercity travel. There are no set costs for this system, however. But the FRA argues that the benefits a high-speed rail system would bring outweigh the costs for the system, claiming that the high-speed rail system would reduce car traffic and eliminate the need for short-haul flights. It would also reduce congestion in America's more populated regions and boost manufacturing activity.

See also 
 The Surface Transportation Board manages economic aspects of railroads, including rates, service, acquisition, and abandonment
 The Federal Transit Administration provides financial and technical assistance to local public transit agencies, including local rail operators not regulated by the FRA (subway, elevated rail, and light rail).
 The Interstate Commerce Commission regulated railroad safety prior to creation of the FRA. Currently defunct.
 The National Transportation Safety Board investigates transportation accidents and crashes, including those involving railroads.
 The United States Railroad Administration operated from 1917 to 1920, currently defunct.
 Rail speed limits in the United States

Gallery

References

External links 
 
 Federal Railroad Administration in the Federal Register
 Records of the Federal Railroad Administration in the National Archives (Record Group 399)

1966 establishments in Washington, D.C.
Government agencies established in 1966
United States railroad regulation
United States Department of Transportation agencies
Railroad
Transportation government agencies of the United States
Organizations established in 1966